Pedulla was an American manufacturer of electric bass guitars from near Boston, Massachusetts. 

The catalog included different series of bass guitars: the Rapture (modern Fender bass clones, 4 and 5 strings), the Thunderbass and the Thunderbolt, respectively neck-through and bolt-on modern bass, and the MVP and Buzz bass, respectively fretted and fretless bass who made Pedulla quite famous in the 1980 decade. Thunderbass, thunderbolt, MVP, and Buzz models were available in 4, 5, and 6 string format, all Made in USA. Pedulla basses were provided with custom Bartolini pickups and electronics, still supported by Bartolini, and a limited selection of options.

This was probably the most original part of the Pedulla approach to the bass guitar: luthiers usually provide a big variety of options for clients, for personalizing every aspect of the instrument. Micheal Pedulla's vision was to build a solid, outstanding bass that was the result of long experiments, and limiting the personalization to the features not impacting on sounds, like colors of painting and color of hardware.

Mike Pedulla announced his retirement in May 2019, and the company ceased its operations after 45 years and 10,000 basses produced.

References

External links 
 Pedulla - Official site (not available anymore)
 

Bass guitar manufacturing companies
Musical instrument manufacturing companies of the United States